Kim Ji-hyang  (born 26 September 1995) is a North Korean athlete competing in long-distance events. Representing North Korea at the 2019 World Athletics Championships, she placed eighth in the women's marathon.

References

External links

Living people
1995 births
North Korean female marathon runners
North Korean female long-distance runners
World Athletics Championships athletes for North Korea
20th-century North Korean women
21st-century North Korean women